Allendale, often marked on maps as Allendale Town, is a village and civil parish in south west Northumberland, England. It is located within the North Pennines Area of Outstanding Natural Beauty.

At the 2001 census, the parish had a population of 2,120, decreasing to 2,021 at the 2011 Census. Allendale is within the North Pennines Area of Outstanding Natural Beauty (AONB); the second largest of the 40 AONB's in England and Wales. The local economy is predominantly based on agriculture (notably sheep farming) and tourism, although of late it has become a popular commuter town for Newcastle upon Tyne.

History 

Allendale refers to the "dale" or valley of the River Allen. Evidence of prehistoric settlement has been found on the surrounding moorland. In the 16th century this area, close to the Scottish border, was a lawless and troubled place.  Fortified farmhouses known as 'bastles' were constructed to protect residents and livestock against reiver raids. Allendale has a concentration of bastles, around 40 can still be seen, many as scenic ruins.

Local mining for lead has occurred since Roman times, with the first smelting mill being constructed in the 1600s. The significant growth of Allendale Town and the surrounding villages was fuelled by that of the local lead-mining and smelting industries in the 19th century. The remains of two flues from the former smelting mill (between Allendale and Catton) run to chimneys up on the fells high above the village. The smelting mill is now home to the Allendale Brewery and the Allenmills Regeneration Project. In 1874 Allendale Co-operative Society was established.

In 1869, the Hexham and Allendale Railway was opened to provide improved transport, but its opening coincided with a rapid decline in the industry due to cheap imports of lead. The last mines in the area closed in 1894 (although an attempt was made to re-open the mine at Allenheads in the 1970s).

With the closure of the lead mines, the population rapidly declined and Allendale became a popular tourist destination for Edwardian Tynesiders seeking a country escape. The railway was finally closed to passengers in 1930 and to goods in 1950 (when the local terminus was bought by the stationmaster and opened as a caravan park.

Popularly held to be the town or dale that is referenced in Charles Jefferys' and Sidney Nelson's 1835 ballad The Rose of Allandale Rose of Allendale, published in the New York Mirror, and later sung by Paddy Reilly, The Dubliners and many others, it seems more likely that this song is either metaphorical or refers literally to the community on Allan Water in the Scottish Highlands at the beginning of the Firth of Forth. The explicit reference to Allendale, moreover, in 'Lucy Gray of Allendale', a musical setting of the earliest known work by Cumbrian poet Robert Anderson, manages to get the spelling of the town correctly.

New Year fire festival
The town's New Year celebrations involve lighted tar barrels that are carried on the heads of revellers called guisers. This tradition dates back so far that it is untraceable. It appears to have originated from the lighting of a silver band that were carolling at New Year. They were unable to use candles to light their music due to the strong winds, so someone suggested a tar barrel be used. Having to move from place to place, it would have been easier to carry the barrels upon the guisers' heads, rather than rolling them. There have been claims that it is a pagan festival. However, these claims are unfounded.

Governance 
Allendale is in the parliamentary constituency of Hexham, Guy Opperman of the Conservative Party is the Member of Parliament.

Prior to Brexit, for the European Parliament its residents voted to elect MEP's for the North East England constituency.

For Local Government purposes it belongs to Northumberland County Council a unitary authority, with Allendale lying in the Tynedale Division. Prior to the 2009 structural changes to local government in England it was part of Tynedale Council.

Allendale has its own Parish Council; Allendale Parish Council.

Economy 

The village hosts a health centre, village shop, Post Office, a store operated by Allendale Co-operative Society, brewery, butchers, chemist, gift shop, tea-room, art-cafe, beauty and holistic healing centre, and several pubs.

Owing to its location, Allendale is a popular country holiday destination. There are a number of holiday cottages in and around the village as well as a caravan park.

The Museum of Classic Sci-Fi is housed in a cellar in the village.

Public services 

Allendale hosts a scout group and there is an active village hall that hosts regular events. Allendale Library is located at Dawson Place in the village square.

There is also a fire station within the town housing one fire appliance that is staffed by part-time firefighters

The local community is served both by the Anglican Church of St. Cuthbert's and a Methodist chapel.

Transport

Air

Bus
The village is served by Go North East's 688 bus service, which links Allenheads, Sinderhope and Allendale with Catton, Langley and Hexham.

Rail
From Hexham, three trains per hour run to Newcastle, with two trains per hour to Carlisle. A less regular service is provided at Haydon Bridge, with 19 trains per day to Newcastle and 17 trains per day to Carlisle.

Road

Education 
Allendale had a Primary School. Allendale Middle School was closed in July 2013 when two-tier education came into force in September that year. Allendale First School left their site on Shilburn Road and moved over to the previous middle school site on 6 November 2013 after a refurbishment.

Sports 

Allen Valley Angling and Conservation provides permits to fish the River East Allen and supports conservation efforts to improve fish stock and riverside access. The river is home to wild brown trout and visiting spawning sea trout and salmon.

Allendale Sports Club operates senior and junior football clubs and other associated sports groups, including a local league netball team. It also has 4 full size tennis courts. The Allen Valley Striders running club welcomes runners of all abilities, including novices, and is also based at the Allendale Sports Club.

Allendale Golf Club was founded in 1906, and the scenic course and clubhouse are located south of the village with green fees offering both annual and easy per-round playing opportunities.

Allendale Cricket Club fields two weekly teams and is affiliated with both the Northumberland Cricket Board and the West Tyne Senior Cricket League. The cricket ground is located just below the village on the riverside.

Each Spring, the Allendale Challenge is a popular fell challenge walk.  Organised by the North of Tyne Mountain Rescue Team the  route covers some of the finest peat bogs in the North Pennines on an anti-clockwise loop from Allendale town.

There is a Bowling Green adjacent to the Village Hall which welcomes new members.

Awards 
The village was the all-England winner of the Calor Village of The Year competition (2007). The Calor Village of the Year competition is organised annually by Community Action Northumberland with sponsorship provided by LPG supplier Calor.

Notable people 

 Philip Larkin (poet)

References

External links 

 Local history
 GENUKI (Accessed: 14 November 2008)
 Northumberland Communities (Accessed: 14 November 2008)
 North Pennines AONB and European Geopark

Market towns in Northumberland
Villages in Northumberland
Civil parishes in Northumberland